The Journal of Cannabis Therapeutics was a pharmacology journal that was founded in 1998 and lasted until 2003. Its editorial board included Geoffrey William Guy and Tod Mikuriya.

See also
 Lester Grinspoon

References

English-language journals
Publications established in 1998